Samuel Herrick (May 29, 1911 – March 20, 1974) was an American astronomer who specialized in celestial mechanics and made important studies preceding the development of manned space flight.

Life 
Herrick was born in Madison County, Virginia, in 1911.

In 1931 Herrick began corresponding with rocket scientist Robert H. Goddard. Goddard was a physicist whose ultimate goal was manned and unmanned space travel. Herrick asked if he should work in this new field which he named astrodynamics. Herrick said that Goddard had the vision to encourage him "to anticipate the basic problems of space navigation." As early as 1936, he had developed a plan for using mathematics and celestial mechanics to solve such problems. Two decades later America had the navigational methods needed to fly Earth satellites and to travel to the Moon and back.

In the late 1940s, Herrick began a one year course at UCLA on rocket navigation. In his mimeographed text book titled Rocket Navigation, copyright 1948-1951, he reworked the classical formulas of celestial mechanics to be more useful in the space age. In the early 1950s the enrollment in this course was around 6, but after Sputnik (1957), it was made a night class and the enrollment jumped to around 35, mostly local aeronautical engineers.

One of the world's foremost leaders in celestial mechanics gave this reminiscence of Herrick: “If he had a fault, it was that he was a perfectionist. His opus magnus [sic] on celestial mechanics and Astro-Dynamics which grew naturally from his lectures, was undoubtedly delayed ten years in its eventual publication by this fault. If every detail was not entirely up to his self-imposed standard, it could not pass muster. He strove to imbue in his students this same critical attitude towards their work. Sam will be remembered as one who strove assiduously for the things in which he believed.” .  More details of the life and work of this descendant of the poet Robert Herrick are to be found in the Journal: Quarterly Journ. Roy. Astron. Soc., Vol. 16, p. 321 - 322 written by his colleague Donald Sadler.

References

External links
University of California Samuel Herrick, Engineering; Astronomy: Los Angeles

American astronomers
1974 deaths
1911 births
Scientists from Virginia
People from Madison County, Virginia